This is a list of known American football players who have played for the Kenosha Maroons of the National Football League in 1924. It includes players that have played at least one match with the team.

A

B
 James Baxter

C
 Irv Carlson
 Walt Cassidy
 Marty Conrad

D
 George Dahlgren

E
 Dick Egan,
 Swede Erickson

G
 Earl Gorman

H
 Fritz Heinisch
 Jon Hunt
 Bill Hurst

O
 Ray Oberbroekling

P
 Clete Patterson
 Pard Pearce
 Earl Potteiger

S
 George Seasholtz
 Jimmy Simpson
 Dick Stahlman

U
 Lou Usher

V
 Dick Vick

W
 Whitey Wolter
 Marv Wood

Kenosha Maroons
 
K
Kenosha Maroon Players